Paris Theodore (January 9, 1943 – November 16, 2006) was an American inventor of gun holsters and firearms and shooting techniques used by government agents and police departments in the U.S. and abroad, as well as by the fictional James Bond.

Early years
Theodore was born in New York City on January 9, 1943, his father, John, was a sculptor and art professor at The Horace Mann School.  His mother, Nenette Charisse was a renowned ballet instructor and member of a Vaudeville dancing company.  Charisse's second husband was Robert Tucker, a Tony-nominated choreographer, and the couple raised Theodore from early childhood.  As a child, Theodore appeared as “Nibs” in NBC's 1955 broadcast of Peter Pan starring Mary Martin.  He graduated from The Browning School on Manhattan's Upper East Side. In 1962, Theodore married Lee Becker, the Tony-nominated dancer and choreographer and founder of The American DanceMachine.

According to his own accounts, Theodore supplemented his work as an abstract painter by serving as an independent contractor for the Central Intelligence Agency while still a teenager in the early 1960s. For several years, he supposedly performed a number of dangerous covert missions for the CIA, many of which, if true, required him to carry and use handguns.  His supposed experience sparked an interest in creating special holsters for the concealment of weapons. “I was working for Uncle Sam as a freedom fighter until Communism imploded on itself,” Theodore said.

In 1966, at the age of 23, Theodore founded Seventrees Ltd., a company that designed and produced gun holsters for professionals  who had the need to conceal weapons yet access them quickly.  Demand among undercover investigators and intelligence agents grew quickly for his innovative designs and Seventrees was soon awarded several contracts from a variety of U.S. agencies.  The growing popularity of the holsters inspired many imitations by other manufacturers.  Even the company's slogan “Unseen in the Best Places” was copied by at least one competitor.

By day, Theodore and his team were manufacturing customized gun holsters, while by night, Seventrees’ West 39th Street offices were transformed into a clandestine weapons manufacturing operation, designing special classified concealment weapons for government agencies through a sister company, Armament Systems Procedures Corporation (ASP).

Invention of the ASP 

One of ASP's first products was a Theodore-designed handgun bearing the name of the company. The ASP, based on the Smith & Wesson Model 39 semi-automatic pistol, featured many innovations: “clear grips”—which enabled the user to see the number of unfired rounds remaining; the “guttersnipe”—a gun sight designed for close range combat; and a “forefinger grip”—today a standard feature on the trigger guard of many modern handguns.  Theodore's  ASP was the first successful service caliber handgun in pocket pistol size. Its arrival inspired a cottage industry of gunsmiths producing unauthorized versions of the weapon, in addition to the authorized factory version from Theodore's ASP Inc.

In 1970, the ASP was featured in The Handgun, by Glaswegian gun expert Geoffrey Boothroyd. Boothroyd, the inspiration for “Q,” the technologically inventive character who outfitted James Bond with his lifesaving gadgets, would, in turn, later inspire Ian Fleming’s successor, John Gardner, to replace Bond’s renowned Walther PPK as 007’s weapon of choice.  Beginning with 1984’s Role of Honor, the ASP would go on to be featured in 11 James Bond novels. James Bond expert James McMahon would later write: “If Bond were a gun, he'd be the ASP. Dark, deadly, perfectly suited to his mission.”

The Quell system 
In 1980, Theodore formed Techpak, a company created to market a combat handgun shooting technique he had developed called “Quell.” The Quell system included a realistic depiction of close quarter combat, a shooting stance, as well as a target designed to enhance the shooter's understanding of the Quell Zone, the area, that when struck, caused the instant cessation of movement by a hostile opponent. Quell drew upon Theodore's real-life experience in close quarter combat and the concept of a "Quell stop" became standard training for many police departments and special agencies throughout the world.  Through Quell, he sought to educate weapons professionals about the stark reality of close combat with handguns. “From the movies we have learned to expect that when someone is shot in the arm, he reacts immediately by grabbing it with his free hand, wincing, and maybe uttering an ‘Unh!’  When he is shot in the chest, a spot of blood appears and he is thrown backwards, usually with arms flailing, to land motionless and silent.” Theodore wrote in 1985, “The truth is that no bullet from a sidearm, no matter what the caliber, will bowl a man over.” He described this “knock-down power” as “the figment of the collective imagination of Hollywood screenwriters.”

Personal life
Theodore's wife Lee died in 1987.  Theodore died November 16, 2006, at St. Luke's hospital in Manhattan. The cause of death was complications resulting from a longstanding and debilitating bout with multiple sclerosis.  He is survived by his sons, Ali and Said Theodore and Paris Kain.  Kain, a filmmaker, is currently producing a documentary based on the life of his late father.

References
 Carr, Patrick and Gardner, George W., (1985) Gun People, Doubleday, New York, NY
 Jones, Rob (1986) “Hunting Guns,” American Hunter Magazine
 Jones, Robert, (December 1985) “Quell—New Concepts in the Kill Zone,” Soldier of Fortune
 McMahon, James (1997) “Q Branch,” HMSS
 McLoughlin, Chris, “On Target For Special Weapons – The Guttersnipe Sight,” International Law Enforcement
 Petzal, David (May 1969), “The Seventrees Story,” Guns And Hunting

External links
 Paris Theodore's obituary in the New York Sun
 Modern Firearms – The ASP

Patents

 Holster (Weapon holsters having one-piece construction), filed December 3, 1992, issued October 12, 1993
 Holster (Weapon holsters having one-piece construction), filed December 3, 1992, issued October 12, 1993
 Holster (Weapon holsters having one-piece construction), filed February 20, 1992, issued May 11, 1993
 Firearm training system (A novel firearms target is described which is useful in training police officers and others in the use of small arms.), filed September 26, 1983, issued April 2, 1985
 Holster (The ornamental design for a holster.), filed August 1, 1980, issued June 1, 1982
 Magazine holder (A cartridge magazine holder including a magnet to hold a pair of cartridge magazines with large portions of the magazines exposed so that they may be easily grasped and withdrawn by the user.), filed February 1, 1974, issued February 17, 1976
 Handcuff case (A handcuff case that is worn on the belt and holds the handcuffs with the frame and jaw exposed so that the handcuffs may be immediately grasped and withdrawn for use by the wearer.), filed December 5, 1973, issued March 11, 1975
 Cartridge pouch (A cartridge pouch made of a single piece of leather and a single snap fastener for holding two groups of about three cartridges each.), filed January 3, 1972, issued December 11, 1973
 Secure holster for revolvers (A holster to be carried high on the hip and having a trigger guard pocket, a muzzle pocket, and a breakfront flap which cooperate to prevent removal of the revolver from the holster.), filed January 3, 1972, issued December 11, 1973
 Gunsight (A gunsight including a rear notch and a smaller front notch, preferably in the form of a block of material having an open channel, formed therein and converging from a rear notch to a front notch, the sides of said channel preferably being of a light color such as yellow.), filed December 23, 1971, issued December 11, 1973
 Grips for handguns (Improved grips for handguns including transparent grip plates to permit viewing of the remaining ammunition in a magazine-fed automatic pistol, a magazine grip extension angled backward from the main grip line and of reduced thickness to provide an efficient grip for the little finger, and a forefinger pocket formed on the front of the trigger guard to provide a secure grip for the forefinger of the free (left) hand thus improving control of recoil when a two-handed hold is used by the shooter for fast firing.), filed December 23, 1971, issued September 18, 1973
 Inside the pants holster (A holster which is adapted to be worn inside the pants, just behind the hip of the wearer and which has a relatively wide flange extending in the plane of the handgun to be carried and molded to the hip of the wearer to stabilize the holster.), filed January 3, 1969, issued June 8, 1971
 Holster (An extremely simple but effective holster which is in the form of a strap which wraps over the top of the frame of a handgun or other firearm and is secured through the trigger guard by a releasable fastening device to hold the weapon.), filed November 26, 1968, issued June 8, 1971

Firearm designers
1943 births
2006 deaths
Handgun holsters
Neurological disease deaths in New York (state)
Deaths from multiple sclerosis
Gunsmiths
20th-century American inventors
Browning School alumni